Kroyeriidae is a family of crustaceans belonging to the order Siphonostomatoida.

Genera:
 Kroeyerina Wilson, 1932
 Kroyeria Beneden, 1853
 Kroyerina Wilson, 1932
 Prokroyeria Deets, 1987

References

Siphonostomatoida